Dorotheus Wilhelmus "Dave" Draijer (born 30 September 1973 in Heemstede) is a Dutch baseball player.

Draijer represented the Netherlands at the 2004 Summer Olympics in Athens where he and his team became sixth. Originally he was not selected for the 2008 Summer Olympics, but due to an injury for Loek van Mil he was eventually called up as his replacement.

External links
Draijer at the Dutch Olympic Archive

1973 births
Living people
Baseball players at the 2004 Summer Olympics
Baseball players at the 2008 Summer Olympics
Olympic baseball players of the Netherlands
Dutch baseball players
People from Heemstede
Konica Minolta Pioniers players
Vaessen Pioniers players
Footballers from North Holland